Jaivardhan Singh (born 9 July 1986) is an Indian politician and is the youngest member of Madhya Pradesh's 14th Vidhan Sabha. He served as the Cabinet Minister of Urban Development and Housing in Kamal Nath Ministry, Government of Madhya Pradesh.

He is the youngest cabinet minister in Madhya Pradesh. He represents Raghogarh Vidhan Sabha constituency in Madhya Pradesh. He won the assembly election in 2013 with a margin of over 59,000 votes, the highest among all candidates in the Congress Party that year. He is son of Digvijaya Singh, the 14th Chief Minister of Madhya Pradesh.

Personal life 
He is married to Sreejamya Shahi, a descendant of the Dumaria royals of north Bihar's West Champaran district.

Education 
He went to Doon school and completed his graduation from Shri Ram College of Commerce, New Delhi. Afterwards, he went abroad to pursue his post graduation and did Master in Public Administration in Development Practice from School of International and Public Affairs, Columbia University New York.

References 

1986 births
Living people
Indian National Congress politicians
The Doon School alumni
Madhya Pradesh MLAs 2013–2018
Madhya Pradesh MLAs 2018–2023
School of International and Public Affairs, Columbia University alumni
Indian National Congress politicians from Madhya Pradesh